Fernando Orlando Velárdez (born January 16, 1981 in San Bernardino, California) is an American professional boxer in the Lightweight division. He's the former USBA Super Bantamweight and WBC Youth World Super Featherweight champion.

Pro career
In September 2001, Fernando knocked out the veteran David Donis to win the USBA Super Bantamweight championship.

WBC Featherweight Championship
On May 3, 2003 Velárdez was knocked out by WBC Featherweight champion Érik Morales at the Mandalay Bay Resort & Casino in Las Vegas, Nevada.

References

External links

American boxers of Mexican descent
Lightweight boxers
1981 births
Living people
Sportspeople from San Bernardino, California
American male boxers